The Canadian province of New Brunswick is divided by the Territorial Division Act into 152 parishes, units which had political significance as subdivisions of counties until the Municipalities Act of 1966. Parishes still exist in law and include any municipality, rural community, or regional municipality within their borders. They provided convenient boundaries for electoral districts and organising delivery of government services for some time after 1966 but were gradually supplanted for such purposes by local service districts (LSDs), which better represent communities of interest. Local governance reforms on 1 January 2023 abolished the local service district as a unit of governance but this did not affect the existence of civil parishes.

Parishes are still used to describe legal boundaries for health administration judicial matters, agricultural boards, and some other entities; highway, fisheries and wildlife, community planning, and some other departments use parishes for rural locations, while some forms still use parishes as the only alternative to municipalities when entering one's community.

Provincial government guidelines require capitalising the word parish only if it follows the specific part of the name: e.g., Hopewell Parish but the parish of Hopewell.

Other uses of the term parish 
Confusion is caused by three other government uses of the term parish.
 The provincial government used LSDs to deliver services to unincorporated parts of the province. 128 LSDs had a name identical to the parish they were at least partly in, but only 26 had the same boundaries as the parish they were named after.
 The provincial government divides the province into taxing authorities for the purpose of calculating and collecting property taxes. Municipalities, rural communities, and regional municipalities can all have multiple taxing authorities. Taxing authorities follow property lines rather than municipal or parish boundaries and often shared the name of an LSD they partially overlapped.
 Statistics Canada uses the term parish for any Census subdivision that is not an incorporated municipality, rural community, regional municipality or Indian reserve. Only 49 CSDs have the same borders as the parish they are named after.

List 
142 of New Brunswick's parishes are used as the basis of census subdivisions by Statistics Canada. Unless noted, all figures below are for census subdivisions, which do not include areas within municipalities, incorporated rural communities, or Indian reserves. Revised census figures based on the 2023 local governance reforms have not been released.

Former and renamed parishes

See also 
Demographics of New Brunswick
Geography of New Brunswick
List of cities in New Brunswick
List of municipal amalgamations in New Brunswick
List of municipalities in New Brunswick 
List of towns in New Brunswick
List of villages in New Brunswick
Rural community

Notes

References 

Local government in New Brunswick
Parishes